Fabio Galante (born 20 November 1973) is an Italian former professional footballer who played as a defender. He represented Italy at the 1996 Summer Olympics.

Playing career
Galante was born in Montecatini Terme, Province of Pistoia. He started his professional career for Serie C1 side Empoli F.C., then coached by Luciano Spalletti. He successively moved to Genoa C.F.C. in 1994, where he won the 1996 Anglo-Italian Cup. He then switched to Internazionale in 1996. With Internazionale, Galante played three seasons, mostly as a backup player, winning an UEFA Cup title in 1998.

In 1999, he signed for Torino Calcio, initially on loan. Torino paid 5.1 billion lire to sign Galante permanently in June 2000, but at the same time selling half of the registration rights of Riccardo Fissore and Franco Semioli to Inter for 6 billion lire (Fissore was later bought back by Torino the following summer for 2 billion lire, meaning the club had acquired Fissore by paying Inter 1.1 billion lire in cash and half of Semioli). Galante spent four seasons with Torino in total, two of them in Serie A. He helped the club to gain Serie A promotion, winning the 2000–01 Serie B title; the following season he helped the club to win a spot in the 2002 UEFA Intertoto Cup.

In 2004, after having been relegated to the role of a backup defender in the Torino squad, he moved to Livorno, where he quickly became a key player and helped the team to maintain a Serie A place until 2008. He was subsequently released for free by the amaranto, but in November 2008 he agreed on a one-year contract with his former team, returning to Livorno for their 2008–09 Serie B campaign.

After football
Galante received his coaching licence on 15 December 2017.

Honours
Genoa
 Anglo-Italian Cup: 1995–96

Inter
 UEFA Cup: 1997–98

Torino
 Serie B: 2000–01

Italy under-21
 UEFA European Under-21 Football Championship: 1994, 1996

References

External links

1973 births
Living people
Sportspeople from the Province of Pistoia
Italian footballers
Association football defenders
Genoa C.F.C. players
Inter Milan players
Torino F.C. players
U.S. Livorno 1915 players
Empoli F.C. players
Serie A players
Serie B players
Italy youth international footballers
Italy under-21 international footballers
Footballers at the 1996 Summer Olympics
Olympic footballers of Italy
UEFA Cup winning players
Footballers from Tuscany